Papyrus 136 (designated as 𝔓136 in the Gregory-Aland numbering system) is a small surviving portion of an early copy of part of the New Testament in Greek. It is a papyrus manuscript of the Acts. The text survives on a single fragment of a rotulus, the text on the verso being upside-down in relationship to the text on the recto. The manuscript has been assigned paleographically to the sixth century.

Location 
𝔓136 is housed at the David M. Rubenstein Library, Duke University, Durham, NC in the United States.

Textual Variants 
 4:27 According to the Smiths' reconstruction, it contains the majority reading  (in this city) along with 𝔓45vid 01 03 05 08 044 33 1241 1739, versus  (in this your city) found in 02 (the phrase is absent in over 20 manuscripts, including 1 18 61 69 88 462 641 1241 1505).
 4:28 According to the Smiths' reconstruction, it reads  (the counsel) along with 02* 03 08* 323 945 1175 1739 versus the majority reading  (your counsel) of 01 05 044 18 33 424 614 1241 1505.
 7:28 A corrector added the missing εκθες to produce the reading εχθεσ	τον	αιγυπτιον as in 𝔓74 01 03* 04 (05 has αιχθεσ	τον	αιγυπτιον) 1175, versus τον αιγυπτιο¯ χθεσ of 02 and the majority reading χθεσ τον αιγυπτιον. All of these are variant ways of expressing the meaning of "yesterday."
 7:30a Along with 05, it abbreviates the number 'forty' as overlined μ, which is usually spelled out as either τεσσερακοντα, as in 𝔓74 01 02 03* 04f 104 1003 1175, or as τεσσαρακοντα, as in 08 044 18 33 81 323 424 614 945 1241 1505 1739 and most other manuscripts. 
 7:30b It retains the character sequence ν πυρ, which indicates that while in pristine condition, it did not read εν φλογι πυρος (in a flame of fire) with the majority of manuscripts; the Smiths reconstruct the reading as εν πυρι φλογος (in a fire of flame), as found in 02 04.

See also 

 List of New Testament papyri

References 

New Testament papyri
3rd-century biblical manuscripts
Early Greek manuscripts of the New Testament